Thomas Wharton, 1st Marquess of Wharton PC (August 1648 – 12 April 1715) was an English nobleman and Whig politician. A man of great charm and political ability, he was also notorious for his debauched lifestyle.

Background

He was the son of Philip Wharton, 4th Baron Wharton, and his second wife, Jane Goodwin, only daughter of Colonel Arthur Goodwin of Upper Winchendon, Buckinghamshire, and heiress to the extensive Goodwin estates in Buckinghamshire, including Winchendon, Wooburn, Waddeston, Weston, and other properties.

Career

In his long political career, he was a Member of Parliament for seventeen years and spearheaded the Whig opposition to King James II's government, which later developed the two-party political system under Queen Anne. Before the Glorious Revolution he was in close contact with a group of army officers conspiring against King James, including his brother Captain Henry Wharton.

In 1689 he was sworn of the Privy Council and made Comptroller of the Household by King William III, establishing the link between the royal position and government for the first time, although William is said to have distrusted him.

He went out of office in 1702, after the accession of Anne, who disliked him intensely, and took great pleasure in personally taking his staff of office from him, but in 1706, he was created Earl of Wharton and Viscount Winchendon in the Peerage of England. He served as Lord Lieutenant of Ireland 1708–1710. He was replaced by the Tory Duke of Ormonde when the Harley Ministry came to power.

He supported the No Peace Without Spain motion in 1711. The following year he attacked the government's creation of Harley's Dozen, twelve new Tory peers in order to secure passage of their peace agreement.

Character and scandals

Anne's antipathy to him was partly the product of her dislike for the Whig Junto, the "five tyrannising lords", which William III had shared to some extent, but owed far more to his debauched and irreligious character. Even by the standards of Restoration rakes, Wharton was considered a man "void of moral or religious principles". The most striking charge was that in 1682, when drunk, he had broken into the church in Great Barrington, Gloucestershire, urinated against the communion table and defecated in the pulpit. The story is probably true: certainly in 1705, during a debate on Church matters in the House of Lords, Wharton was left speechless when Thomas Osborne, 1st Duke of Leeds reminded him of it.

Despite his faults, he has been described as a man of immense charm, a fine public speaker and a "political organiser of genius". As the dominant politician in Aylesbury, he was partly responsible for the landmark constitutional case of Ashby v White, which established the principle that for every wrong there is a remedy.

It is rumoured that Wharton had taken Dorothy Townshend, née Walpole, as a lover prior to her marriage. Rumours suggest that her later husband, Charles Townshend, 2nd Viscount Townshend may have either killed her or faked her funeral and hid her away at Raynham Hall. This rumour is based on the alleged infidelity of Dorothy during their marriage. She is also rumoured to haunt Raynham, known as the Brown Lady of Raynham Hall.

Macaulay's History of England describes Wharton in prose:

Last years
Under George I of Great Britain, he returned to favour. In January 1715, he was created Marquess of Catherlough, Earl of Rathfarnham, and Baron Trim in the Peerage of Ireland, and in February 1715 Marquess of Wharton and Marquess of Malmesbury in the Peerage of Great Britain.

When he died suddenly in April 1715 he was buried in Upper Winchendon, Buckinghamshire. He is the author of the original lyrics of Lillibullero, which "rhymed King James out of England".

Family

Wharton married firstly on 16 September 1673 Anne, or Nan, Lee (d 29 October 1685 aged 26), younger daughter of Sir Henry Lee, 3rd Bt. (d. 1659), an elder half-brother of the famous libertine poet John Wilmot, 2nd Earl of Rochester; she had some reputation as a poet and dramatist. They had no issue together. Her sister Eleanora Lee married James Bertie, Lord Norreys; their cousin was Edward Lee, 1st Earl of Lichfield. Although her husband may have infected her with syphilis, Anne Wharton left him her fortune. Her grandmother Anne St. John, Countess of Rochester tried to regain her fortune from the Whartons with little effect.

He married secondly Lucy Loftus, only daughter and heiress of Adam Loftus, 1st Viscount Lisburne and Lucy Brydges. They had one son Philip Wharton, 1st Duke of Wharton, and two daughters, Lucy Morice and Jane Holt. On his son's death without heirs, all his titles became extinct, except the Barony which passed to Jane Holt.

See also
 Whig Junto

References

Succession boxes

|-

|-

1648 births
1715 deaths
Lord-Lieutenants of Buckinghamshire
Lord-Lieutenants of Oxfordshire
Lords Privy Seal
Marquesses in the Peerage of Great Britain
Members of the Privy Council of England
English MPs 1661–1679
English MPs 1679
English MPs 1680–1681
English MPs 1681
English MPs 1685–1687
English MPs 1689–1690
English MPs 1690–1695
English MPs 1695–1698
Members of the Kit-Kat Club
Catherlough
Peers of Ireland created by George I
Lords Lieutenant of Ireland
Barons Wharton
Whig (British political party) politicians